Konráð Olavsson (born 11 March 1968) is an Icelandic former handball player who competed in the 1992 Summer Olympics.

References

1968 births
Living people
Konrad Olavsson
Konrad Olavsson
Handball players at the 1992 Summer Olympics